Holmeja is a locality situated in Svedala Municipality, Skåne County, Sweden with 239 inhabitants in 2010. Later, the skull fragments were donated to the school museum in Torup, where they were exhibited in a stand under the inscription "Baras äldste".

Geography

Climate
Homelja features a Cool Summer Continental Climate (Köppen climate classification: Dfb), with temperatures in summer months rarely exceeding 20 °C (68 °F) and winters being cold and brisk.

References 

Populated places in Svedala Municipality
Populated places in Skåne County